40S ribosomal protein S27a is a protein that in humans is encoded by the RPS27A gene.

Ubiquitin, a highly conserved protein that has a major role in targeting cellular proteins for degradation by the 26S proteosome, is synthesized as a precursor protein consisting of either polyubiquitin chains or a single ubiquitin fused to an unrelated protein. This gene encodes a fusion protein consisting of ubiquitin at the N terminus and ribosomal protein S27a at the C terminus. When expressed in yeast, the protein is post-translationally processed, generating free ubiquitin monomer and ribosomal protein S27a. Ribosomal protein S27a is a component of the 40S subunit of the ribosome and belongs to the S27AE family of ribosomal proteins. It contains C4-type zinc finger domains and is located in the cytoplasm. Pseudogenes derived from this gene are present in the genome. As with ribosomal protein S27a, ribosomal protein L40 is also synthesized as a fusion protein with ubiquitin; similarly, ribosomal protein S30 is synthesized as a fusion protein with the ubiquitin-like protein fubi.

References

Further reading

Ribosomal proteins